Kjellberg may refer to:

People
Agnes de Frumerie (1869–1937), Swedish artist
Anna Kjellberg (born 1984), Swedish Olympic sailor
Bertil Kjellberg (born 1953), Swedish politician of the Moderate Party
Ellen Kjellberg (born 1948), Norwegian dancer
Felix Arvid Ulf Kjellberg (born 1989), (better known as PewDiePie), Swedish web-based comedian and video producer
Friedl Kjellberg (1905-1993), Austrian-born Finnish ceramist
Lennart Kjellberg (1857–1936), Swedish  archaeologist
Marzia Kjellberg (born 1992), Italian internet personality and entrepreneur, wife of Felix
Oscar Kjellberg (1870–1931), Swedish inventor and industrialist
Patric Kjellberg (born 1969), Swedish ice hockey player
Peder Kjellberg (1902–1975), Norwegian boxer
Reidar Kjellberg (1904–1978), Norwegian art historian and museum director

Other uses
Anders Kjellberg Farm, a building in Indiana, United States
Kjellberg Finsterwalde, a group of German companies in the metal and electrical industry
Kjellberg Peak, a small rock peak in Antarctica

See also
Kjell Berg, Norwegian curler

ru:Чельберг
sv:Kjellberg